The Official Encyclopedia of Bridge (OEB) presents comprehensive information on the card game contract bridge with limited information on related games and on playing cards. It is "official" in reference to the American Contract Bridge League (ACBL) which authorized its production and whose staff prepared and/or supervised its various editions.

The first edition of the Encyclopedia was published in 1964 with Richard Frey as Editor-in-Chief; it was the only one with an edition revised for an overseas market (The Bridge Players' Encyclopedia, 1967). The seventh and latest edition was published in 2011 following intermediate editions in 1971, 1976, 1984, 1994 and 2001. The Executive Editor for the first six was Alan Truscott, bridge editor of The New York Times. For the fourth through sixth editions, Henry Francis succeeded Frey as Editor-in-Chief. Frey and Francis were also successive editors of the ACBL monthly membership magazine. Numerous contributing editors to the Encyclopedia were listed in each edition as were members of Editorial Advisory Boards.

The redesigned seventh edition, in preparation since 2006, was released in November 2011. Editor was Brent Manley, with primary assistance from Mark Horton, Barry Rigal and Tracey Yarbro. This is the first edition to depart from the traditional alphabetical listing of individual entries and present a compilation of entries grouped into chapters, such as Bidding, Conventions and Card Play. Numerous photographs are included, together with two CDs; one containing the full printed version of the Encyclopedia and the other with biographies and tournament results.

First edition – 1964
The first edition set the ground work for the goals and scope of the Encyclopedia. In its  forward, Editor-in-Chief Richard L. Frey observed that:
The only previous Encyclopedia of Bridge was edited by Ely Culbertson and published in 1935 ... The ambitious goal set for this Official Encyclopedia of Bridge was simple to state: "To provide an official and authoritative answer to any question a reader might ask about the game of contract bridge and its leading players."

On its dust jacket, the first edition states:
This encyclopedia is the most complete and authoritative book of information, guidance, and instruction for bridge players, ever published.  It covers every aspect of bridge in all bridge-playing countries of the world; it contains complete and lucid definitions of every term; it describes and illustrates every standard bid, every recognized convention, and every type of play.

The first edition is divided into two main parts:
Main listings: The Introduction  indicates that the entries in the main listings fall into five main categories (technical, historical, procedural, biographical and geographical, and terminological) and are presented alphabetically over 683 pages with entries frequently ending with cross-references to other entries on related category topics. Over 50 bridge-playing countries are listed and brief biographies of over 1,500 American and over 400 other players are recorded.
Bibliography: The main listings are followed by an eight-page bibliography.

The Harvard University online catalog entry for the first edition includes a note that "A great majority of the unsigned technical entries are by Alan Truscott."

Editors 
Richard L. Frey, Editor-in-Chief
Alan F. Truscott, Executive Editor

Editorial Advisory Board

 Albert H. Morehead, Chairman
B. Jay Becker
Geoffrey L. Butler
Carlos Cabanne
S. Carini-Mazzaccara
Robert de Nexon

Charles H. Goren
Alfred M. Gruenther
Ranik Halle
Johannes Hammerich
Ernst Heldring
Oswald Jacoby

Eric Jannersten
Alvin Landy
Alphonse Moyse, Jr.
Carlo Alberto Perroux
David R. Pigot
Leon Sapire

Alfred Sheinwold
Charles J. Solomon
Michael J. Sullivan
Severo A. Tuason
Harold Vanderbilt
Waldemar von Zedtwitz

Contributing Editors

Russell Baldwin
Jean Besse
George W. Beynon
Easley Blackwood
Jens Boeck
George S. Coffin
Eric Crowhurst
Victor R. Daly
Albert Dormer
Albert Field
Harry Fishbein
Mrs. A.L. Fleming
Sam Fry, Jr.
Richard Goldberg
Harry Goldwater

M. Harrison-Gray
Mrs. Dorothy Hayden
Lee Hazen
Don Horwitz
Monroe Ingberman
Arturo Jaques
Edwin B. Kantar
Edgar Kaplan
Sammy Kehela
Jack Kelly
Edwart Kempson
José Le Dentu
A. Littman-Lemaitre
Paul Lukacs

Arthur Marks
Mrs. Rixi Markus
Philip Merry
Marshall L. Miles
Victor Mollo
Florence Osborn
George Partos
Harry Polunsky
R. Anthony Priday
Terence Reese
William S. Root
Federico Rosa
Dr. George Rosenkranz
Lawrence Rosler

Ernest Rovere
Jeff Rubens
Howard Schenken
Jerome Scheuer
William Seamon
Ramon Skoroupo
Al Sobel
Norman Squire
Sam Stayman
Roy G. Telfer
Alec Traub
Robert Wakeman
Charlton Wallace
Robert W. Wilson

International Edition
In 1967 an edition revised for the needs of a British and European audience was published by Paul Hamlyn (London) under the title The Bridge Players' Encyclopedia. It was described as an International Edition based on The Official Encyclopedia of Bridge of 1964. The edition modified American spellings, 'translated' bidding structures to the more widely used Acol system, omitted biographical notes on some lesser known Americans and added biographical notes on British and European players resulting in coverage of over 50 countries and over 500 players. The editors were Ben Cohen and Rhoda Barrow.

Second edition – 1971 
Richard Frey writes that since the first edition of 1964,  ... bridge has attracted new adherents throughout the world, systems and conventions have been more and more influenced by "science" and "artificiality" ...

The second edition is divided into four main parts:
Main listings: technical bidding and play, historical, procedural (tournament organization, laws, etc.), geographical, and terminological. As in the first edition, entries frequently end with cross-references to other entries on related topics.
Biographies of leading personalities: The biographies include over 2,000 Americans and over 500 players from elsewhere.
Tournament results: American Bridge Association National Championships, All-American Regional Championships, and European, Far East and South American Championships. World Championships and USBA Grand Nationals are in the main listings
Bibliography: listed according to subject matter.

Editors 
Richard L. Frey, Editor-in-Chief
Alan F. Truscott, Executive Editor
Thomas S. Smith, Managing Editor

Editorial Advisory Board

B. Jay Becker
Geoffrey L. Butler
Carlos Cabanne
S. Carini-Mazzaccara
Charles H. Goren

Alfred M. Gruenther
Ranik Halle
Johannes Hammerich
Ernst Heldring
Oswald Jacoby

Eric Jannersten
Edgar Kaplan
Alphonse Moyse, Jr.
Carlo Alberto Perroux
Leon Sapire

Alfred Sheinwold
Charles J. Solomon
Michael J. Sullivan
Severo A. Tuason
Waldemar von Zedtwitz

Contributing Editors

Mrs. Rhoda Barrow
Jean Besse
Easley Blackwood
Jens Boeck
George S. Coffin
Eric Crowhurst
Victor R. Daly
Albert Dormer
Albert Field
Mrs. A.L. Fleming
Sam Fry, Jr.
Richard Goldberg
Harry Goldwater
M. Harrison-Gray*

Mrs. Dorothy Hayden
Lee Hazen
Don Horwitz
Monroe Ingberman
Arturo Jaques
Edwin B. Kantar
Fred Karpin
Sammy Kehela
Jack Kelly*
Edwart Kempson*
José Le Dentu
A. Littman-Lemaitre
Paul Lukacs
Arthur Marks*

Mrs. Rixi Markus
Philip Merry
Marshall L. Miles
Victor Mollo
George Partos
Harry Polunsky
R. Anthony Priday
Terence Reese
William S. Root
Federico Rosa
Dr. George Rosenkranz
Lawrence Rosler
Ernest Rovere

Jeff Rubens
Howard Schenken
Jerome Scheuer
William Seamon
Ramon Skoroupo*
Terry Smith
Al Sobel
Sam Stayman
Roy G. Telfer
Alec Traub
Robert Wakeman
Charlton Wallace
Robert W. Wilson*

Third edition – 1976 
Richard Frey comments on several themes in the foreword to the third edition:
We have seen rapid and radical developments in bidding systems; explosions of new cheating scandals and employment of devices to prevent them; the creation of techniques for warning opponents about bids that have unusual meanings ...
... the newly uncovered evidence that bridge was known and played before the earliest previous accreditation (to Russia) of its origin and its name.

The third edition is organized into the same four parts as the second.  There are again over 2,500 biographies but newer and stricter criteria were applied and many previous entries have been superseded by new ones; successes in competitions remain in the appropriate event listings.

Editors 
Richard L. Frey, Editor-in-Chief
Alan F. Truscott, Executive Editor
Amalya L. Kearse, Editor, Third Edition

Editorial Advisory Board

B. Jay Becker
Geoffrey L. Butler
Carlos Cabanne
S. Carini-Mazzaccara
Herman Filarski
Richard L. Goldberg

Charles Goren
Alfred M. Gruenther
Ranik Halle
Johannes Hammerich
Ernst Heldring
Oswald Jacoby

Eric Jannersten
Edgar Kaplan
José Le Dentu
A. Littman-Lemaitre
Carlo Alberto Perroux

Julius Rosenblum
George Rosenkranz
Leon Sapire
Alfred Sheinwold
Waldemar von Zedtwitz

Contributing Editors

Jean Besse
Easley Blackwood
Jens Boeck
George S. Coffin
Ralph Cohen
Eric Crowhurst
Victor R. Daly
Albert Dormer
Robert Ewen
Albert Field
Mrs. A.L. Fleming
Henry G. Francis
Harold Franklin

Sam Fry, Jr.
Richard Goldberg
Harry Goldwater
Lee Hazen
Don Horwitz
Monroe Ingberman
Arturo Jaques
Edwin B. Kantar
Fred Karpin
Sammy Kehela
Ron Klinger
Rhoda Barrow Lederer
Paul Lukacs

Rixi Markus
Philip Merry
Marshall L. Miles
Victor Mollo
George Partos
R. Anthony Priday
Terence Reese
William S. Root
Lawrence Rosler
Ernest Rovere
Jeff Rubens
Howard Schenken

William Seamon
Edith Simon
Terry Smith
Thomas M. Smith
Sam Stayman
Roy G. Telfer
Alec Traub
Robert True
Dorothy Hayden Truscott
Jo Van Den Borre
Robert Wakeman
Charlton Wallace

Fourth edition – 1984
The fourth edition contains 922 pages — the most of any edition.  Again, the pace of change in bridge is great as Richard Frey, now Editor Emeritus having been succeeded as Editor-in-Chief by Henry Francis, notes in the Foreword, ... a quantum leap in the technical material ... many new and intriguing methods and ideas have made their appearance in the past seven years, and some have been widely adopted.

The organization of the fourth edition follows that of the third and second.

Editors 
Henry G. Francis, Editor-in-Chief
Alan F. Truscott, Executive Editor
Richard L. Frey, Editor Emeritus
Diane Hayward, Editor, Fourth Edition

Editorial Advisory Board

B. Jay Becker
Geoffrey L. Butler
Carlos Cabanne
S. Carini-Mazzaccara
Benno Gimkiewicz

Richard L. Goldberg
Charles Goren
Ranik Halle
Johannes Hammerich
Denis Howard

Oswald Jacoby
Edgar Kaplan
José Le Dentu
Jaime Ortiz-Patiño

George Rosenkranz
Leon Sapire
Alfred Sheinwold
Waldemar von Zedtwitz

Contributing Editors

Bertrand N. Bauer
Jean Besse
Easley Blackwood
George S. Coffin
Ralph Cohen
Eric Crowhurst
Victor R. Daly
George F. Donaghy
Albert Dormer
Sue Emery
Robert Ewen
Albert Field
Irene (Dimmie) Fleming

Harold Franklin
Sam Fry, Jr.
Richard Goldberg
Harry Goldwater
Lee Hazen
Don Horwitz
Monroe Ingberman
Arturo Jaques
Edwin B. Kantar
Fred Karpin
Steve Katz
Sammy Kehela
Ron Klinger

Rhoda Barrow Lederer
Rixi Markus
Philip Merry
Marshall L. Miles
Richard Oshlaf
George Partos
Richard Anthony Priday
Terence Reese
William S. Root
Lawrence Rosler
Ernest Rovere
Jeff Rubens

William Sachen
William Seamon
Edith Simon
Terry Smith
Thomas M. Smith
Sam Stayman
Peggy Sutherlin
Roy G. Telfer
Alec Traub
Robert True
Dorothy Hayden Truscott
Jo Van Den Borre

Fifth edition – 1994 
In the Foreword, Alan Truscott notes,The changes in the technical section have been far greater than in any of the earlier editions, reflecting the many theoretical advances in the past decade.

The four part organization of the book follows the format of its immediate predecessors.  More than 2,800 bridge personalities are listed in the biographies, largely updated by Dorthy Fancis; Truscott prepared most of the technical and foreign material with Frank Stewart contributing significantly to the technical; the expanded 21 page bibliography was prepared by William Sachen. Previous editions were published by Crown Publishers Inc. of New York; the 5th edition was published by the American Contract Bridge League.

Editors
Henry G. Francis, Editor-in-Chief
Alan F. Truscott, Executive Editor
Dorthy A Francis, Editor, Fifth Edition

Contributing Editors

Phillip Alder
Carlos Cabanne
Larry N. Cohen
Gabriel Chagas
Hugh Darwen
Sue Emery
Albert Field

Santanu Ghose
Richard Grenside
Olof Hanner
Diane Hayward
Per Jannersten
Jared Johnson

Patrick Jourdain
Edgar Kaplan
Phillip Martin
Svend Novrup
David Parry
R. Anthony Priday

Bill Sachen
Ton Schipperheyn
Frank Stewart
Jess Stuart
Dorothy Truscott
Sol Weinstein

Sixth edition – 2001

The front inside panel of the dust jacket states:
"This work is the most complete and authoritative book of information, guidance and instruction ever published for bridge players."

The Foreword states,This edition has been prepared primarily by Henry Francis, with major contributions and help from Alan Truscott and Barry Rigal. Once again Dorthy Francis has updated American biographies and world-wide tournament results. Tim Bourke, who owns one of the world's most complete bridge libraries and who assembled the Morehead Library at ACBL Headquarters, prepared the bibliography.

The four part organization of the book follows the format of its immediate predecessors.  More than 3,000 bridge personalities are listed in the biographies; the 60 page bibliography doubled that of the previous edition.

Editors
Henry G. Francis, Editor-in-Chief
Alan F. Truscott, Executive Editor
Dorthy A Francis, Editor, Sixth Edition

Contributing Editors

Phillip Alder
Carlos Cabanne
Gabriel Chagas
Hugh Darwen
Herman De Wael

Elly Ducheyne-Swaan
Albert Field
Santanu Ghose
Anna Gudge
Mazhar Jafri

Per Jannersten
Danny Kleinman
Eric Kokish
Sandra Landy
Jean-Paul Meyer

Svend Novrup
Julian Pottage
Barry Rigal
Gianarrigo Rona

Seventh edition – 2011 
The 7th edition had its beginning about 2006, when decisions were made about the format, the contents and the people who would be involved in putting it together.
It departs from previous editions in several ways. Foremost is the medium: two CD-ROM volumes with one book whose contents match the first CD. All previous editions were one-volume books.

This edition introduces photographs and has many of them. It comes with an index instead of a cross-reference table. In the print volume, both pages and font are bigger. The four-part organization introduced in 1971, with a very large alphabetical part one, has been replaced by about 40 chapters and appendices. The printed book and the first CD both comprise chapters 1 to 26. The second volume, CD only, comprises eight chapters of biographical entries and three appendices on Masterpoints achievements and tournament results.

Editors 
Brent Manley, Editor
Mark Horton, Co-Editor
Tracey Greenberg-Yarbro, Co-Editor
Barry Rigal, Co-Editor

Contributing editors 

Current edition

Henry B. Anderson
Bill Buttle
John Carruthers
Simon Cocheme
Lee Daugharty
Tom Dawson
Judy Dawson

Herman De Wael
Fred Gitelman
Robb Gordon
Terre Gorham
Anna Gudge
Peter Hasenson
Per Jannersten

Peggy Kaplan
Paul Linxwiler
Donna Manley
Jan Martel
Kelley McGuire
Jean-Paul Meyer
Pony Nehmert

Julian Pottage
Jeff Rubens
Frank Stewart
Ron Tacchi
Bob van de Velde
Jeroen Warmerdam
Anders Wirgen

Past editions

Phillip Alder
Jean Besse
Larry N. Cohen
Eric Crowhurst
Albert Dormer
Sue Emery
Robert Ewen
Richard Grenside
Olof Hanner

Maurice Harrison-Gray
Diane Hayward
Monroe Ingbergman
Jane Johnson
Jared Johnson
Patrick Jourdain

Edgar Kaplan
Fred Karpin
Sami Kehela
Rhoda Barrow Lederer
Phillip Martin
Marshall Miles
Victor Mollo

David Parry
Tony Priday
Bill Sachen
Jess Stuart
Alec Traub
Dorothy Truscott
Ray Telfer
Sol Weinstein

Contents 
The book contains the following Table of Contents; the first of two compact discs (CD) contains a Portable Document Format (pdf) version of the book.

Chapter 1. History
Chapter 2. ACBL Hall of Fame
Chapter 3. CBF Hall of Fame
Chapter 4. Bridge at the Top
Chapter 5. Bridge Museum
Chapter 6. ACBL – How it Works
Chapter 7. Tournaments
Chapter 8. Trophies
Chapter 9. World of Bridge
Chapter 10. Terminology
Chapter 11. Bidding
Chapter 12. Competitive Bidding
Chapter 13. Conventions
Chapter 14. Systems

Chapter 15. Card play
Chapter 16. Matchpoints vs. IMPs
Chapter 17. Carding
Chapter 18. Advanced Plays
Chapter 19. Squeezes
Chapter 20. Suit Combination
Chapter 21. At the Table
Chapter 22. Mathematics at Bridge
Chapter 23. Rules and "Laws" of Bridge
Chapter 24. Bridge and the Digital Age
Chapter 25. Curiosities
Chapter 26. Rubber Bridge

The second CD provides more information about bridge people and competitions per the following table of contents; its contents are not available in print. 

ACBL Hall of Fame 
CBF Hall of Fame
Grand Life Masters
Platinum Life Masters
Emerald Life Masters
Diamond Life Masters
Other Noted Personalities
ACBL Presidents
National Tournament Directors

Appendix One — North American Results
Appendix Two — Masterpoints Race Results
Appendix Three — World Championship Results

Bibliographic data

See also 
Encyclopedic bibliographies on bridge

References 

Contract bridge books
20th-century encyclopedias